Tharpa Publications (Sanskrit for "liberation" and pronounced "Tar-pa") is a New York-based "major international and multilingual publisher of Buddhist books" by the Buddhist author and scholar Geshe Kelsang Gyatso. These include basic Buddhist meditation books such as The New Meditation Handbook, books on the Buddhist way of life such as Universal Compassion, books on Buddhist philosophy and psychology such as Heart of Wisdom, and books on Buddhist Tantra. Tharpa Publications is a non-profit corporation that has operated for 25 years and claims to have sold over a million books. Waterhouse adds that the books "are distributed widely and may be seen on the shelves of popular booksellers as well as in university libraries."

Kelsang Gyatso

To date, Tharpa has published 22 of his books, covering the entire range of Buddha Shakyamuni's Sutra and Tantra teachings. These are in the process of being translated into German, Spanish, French, Portuguese, Japanese, Chinese, Dutch and Croatian. According to its website, "Tharpa publishes the works of Geshe Kelsang Gyatso, a contemporary Buddhist master who presents the essential practices of Buddhism in a way that is easy to understand and practice in modern everyday life." Biography Research Guide describes Kelsang Gyatso's books:

A number of Kelsang Gyatso's textbooks have received favorable reviews. Bluck writes that "The three most popular works—Introduction to Buddhism, The New Meditation Handbook and Transform Your Life—have sold 165,000 copies between them, showing their appeal far beyond the movement itself." Batchelor says that Kelsang Gyatso's books are written with "considerable clarity." Braizer echoes this sentiment, saying that Kelsang  writes "excellent" books that are "an important contribution to Western understanding of Buddhism and its traditions. They can stand on their own merit." Guide to Dakini Land and Essence of Vajrayana have been described as "the most detailed and revealing commentary on specific tantric practices yet to be published in a Western language." In his book review of Guide to Dakini Land, Richard Guard said:

The books are also highly thought of within the Tibetan establishment. Three of his published works contained forewords by previous Ganden Tripas and the Dalai Lama. The Dalai Lama contributed a foreword to Buddhism in the Tibetan Tradition, while Trijang Rinpoche and Ling Rinpoche (who each held the position of Ganden Tripa) also provided forewords for his books Meaningful to Behold (which was dedicated to the long life of the Dalai Lama) and Clear Light of Bliss (which was dedicated to the late Trijang Rinpoche), respectively. Kyabje Ling Rinpoche refers to Kelsang Gyatso as "this most precious Spiritual Guide," while Kyabje Trijang Rinpoche refers to him as "The excellent expounder, the great Spiritual Master Kelsang Gyatso." Tsem Tulku praised Kelsang Gyatso and his publications: "The great master, the Kadampa Geshe, Kelsang Gyatso, you can see very clearly his works, his centers, his books, his pure vows, and how many thousands of people he affects."

New Kadampa Tradition

Tharpa Publications is part of the New Kadampa Tradition - International Kadampa Buddhist Union, which is an international Buddhist charity set up for building Buddhist temples for world peace in every major city of the world. It was established in 1985 in Ulverston, UK and now has affiliates in countries throughout the world.

Je Tsongkhapa

Tharpa Publications is devoted to the preservation of the tradition of Je Tsongkhapa:

For example, Joyful Path of Good Fortune is based on Je Tsongkhapa's Lamrim Chenmo (Great Exposition of the Stages of the Path to Enlightenment). Other examples include:

Universal Compassion is based on Je Tsongkhapa's Sunrays of Training the Mind
Understanding the Mind is based on Je Tsongkhapa’s teachings on Commentary to Valid Cognition by Dharmakirti
Guide to Dakini Land and Essence of Vajrayana are based on Be dön kun säl (Illuminating All Hidden Meanings) and Je Tsongkhapa's commentary to the Heruka sadhana, Dö jo (Wishfulfilling)
Clear Light of Bliss is based on Lamp Thoroughly Illuminating the Five Stages
Tantric Grounds and Paths is based on Great Exposition of the Stages of Secret Mantra
Ocean of Nectar is based on Clear Illumination of the Intention: An Extensive Explanation of the Great Treatise ‘Guide to the Middle Way’. 
The New Meditation Handbook and Joyful Path of Good Fortune are based on Je Tsongkhapa's commentaries to Atisha's Lamrim teachings.

Preserving the Gelugpa tradition

The teachings in Tharpa's books are also in the Gelugpa lineage of Pabongka Rinpoche and Trijang Rinpoche's teachings. For example, Joyful Path of Good Fortune is a modern equivalent of Liberation in the Palm of Your Hand, written by Je Phabongkhapa and edited by Trijang Rinpoche; and The New Meditation Handbook is a concise rendition of these teachings. In the preface of Joyful Path the author writes: 

Waterhouse notes that "All pictorial material produced by the NKT is carefully controlled to maintain the accuracy in the smallest detail":

Use of Tharpa's books on Buddhist study programs worldwide

Fourteen of Tharpa Publications classic textbooks are used as the basis of the New Kadampa Tradition's Foundation Program and Teacher Training Program, which have tens of thousands of Buddhist students worldwide. The Foundation Program is described by Steven Heine in Buddhism in the Modern World: Adaptations of an Ancient Tradition:

The New Kadampa Tradition's Teacher Training Program is a rigorous "multilayered educational" study program of Buddha's teachings of Sutra and Tantra presented in accordance with the tradition of the Tibetan master Je Tsongkhapa (AD 1357-1419), designed for those training as Buddhist teachers.

Finances
Losing money each year from 1985 onward, Tharpa Publications "broke even" for the first time in 1996. Tharpa Publications claims that, since that time, the author has donated all royalties from Tharpa's books to non-profit organizations that promote Buddhism. Firstly he gave these to Manjushri Institute:

Now Tharpa says that the author donates all royalties to the International Temples' Fund. Each book also contains the information: "Profits received by Tharpa Publications from the sale of this book will be donated to the NKT-International Temples Project" which is "a Buddhist Charity, Building for World Peace."

Publications

The books by Kelsang Gyatso in the order they were published:

Meaningful to Behold: The Bodhisattva's Way of Life, Tharpa Publications (5th. ed., 2008) 
Clear Light of Bliss: Tantric Meditation Manual, Tharpa Publications (2nd. ed., 1992) 
Heart of Wisdom: An Explanation of the Heart Sutra, Tharpa Publications (4th. ed., 2001) 
Universal Compassion: Inspiring Solutions for Difficult Times, Tharpa Publications (4th. ed., 2002) 
The New Meditation Handbook: Meditations to Make Our Life Happy and Meaningful, Tharpa Publications (2003) 
Joyful Path of Good Fortune: The Complete Buddhist Path to Enlightenment, Tharpa Publications (2nd. ed., 1995) 
Guide to Dakini Land: The Highest Yoga Tantra Practice of Buddha Vajrayogini, Tharpa Publications (2nd. ed., 1996) 
The Bodhisattva Vow: A Practical Guide to Helping Others, Tharpa Publications (2nd. ed., 1995) 
Heart Jewel: The Essential Practices of Kadampa Buddhism, Tharpa Publications (2nd. ed., 1997) 
Great Treasury of Merit: How to Rely Upon a Spiritual Guide, Tharpa Publications (1992) 
Introduction to Buddhism: An Explanation of the Buddhist Way of Life, Tharpa Publications (2nd. ed., 2001, US ed. 2008) 
Understanding the Mind: The Nature and Power of the Mind, Tharpa Publications (2nd. ed., 1997) 
Tantric Grounds and Paths: How to Enter, Progress on, and Complete the Vajrayana Path, Tharpa Publications (1994) 
Ocean of Nectar: The True Nature of All Things, Tharpa Publications (1995) 
Essence of Vajrayana: The Highest Yoga Tantra Practice of Heruka Body Mandala, Tharpa Publications (1997) 
Living Meaningfully, Dying Joyfully: The Profound Practice of Transference of Consciousness, Tharpa Publications (1999) 
Eight Steps to Happiness: The Buddhist Way of Loving Kindness, Tharpa Publications (2000) 
Transform Your Life: A Blissful Journey, Tharpa Publications (2001, US ed. 2007) 
How to Solve Our Human Problems: The Four Noble Truths, Tharpa Publications (2005, US ed., 2007) 
Mahamudra Tantra: The Supreme Heart Jewel Nectar, Tharpa Publications (2005) 
Guide to the Bodhisattva's Way of Life: How to Enjoy a Life of Great Meaning and Altruism, a translation of Shantideva's Bodhisattvacharyavatara with Neil Elliott, Tharpa Publications (2002) 

Tharpa Publications was originally a general Buddhist publishing house, also releasing the following works by other authors:

The Eternal Legacy: An Introduction to the Canonical Literature of Buddhism, Tharpa Publications (1985) by Sangharakshita, .
A Survey of Buddhism: Its Doctrines and Methods through the Ages, Tharpa Publications (1987) by Sangharakshita,    .
Treasury of Dharma: A Tibetan Buddhist Meditation Course, Tharpa Publications (1988) by Geshe Rabten, .

In addition to publishing books, Tharpa also supplies audio books, Buddhist art, and sadhanas for prayer and meditation.

The 'half-drop' repeat patterns used in some NKT-IKBU artwork as well as sadhana covers, such as the peony-style flower and emblem of Manjushri (a sword and book upon a lotus) were designed by Robert Beer.

Tharpa affiliates
Tharpa Publications also has affiliates (which are independent companies) in Brazil, the USA, Spain, Mexico, France, Canada, Australia, Hong Kong and South Africa.

Translations
Tharpa books have been translated into a number of European and Asian languages.

Footnotes

External links
 Official site

Articles
 Buddhist Publisher Reaps Profits of Enlightenment by Alison Eadie (1993-04-18), The Independent, retrieved 2009-12-20.

Book Reviews
 Guide to Dakini Land: A Commentary to the Highest Yoga Tantra Practice of Vajrayogini, reviewed by Richard Guard. Tibetan Journal (Autumn 1991), pp. 80–83.
 How to Solve Our Human Problems: The Four Noble Truths, reviewed by Frederic and Mary Ann Brussat, retrieved 2009-08-27.
 How to Solve Our Human Problems: The Four Noble Truths, reviewed by Publishers Weekly, retrieved 2009-08-27.
 Introduction to Buddhism: An Explanation of the Buddhist Way of Life, reviewed by Foreword Magazine's Pam Kingsbury, retrieved 2018-10-30.
 The New Meditation Handbook: Meditations to Make Our Life Happy and Meaningful, reviewed by Frederic and Mary Ann Brussat, retrieved 2009-08-27.
 The New Meditation Handbook: Meditations to Make Our Life Happy and Meaningful, reviewed by ''Foreword Magazine'''s Duncan Sprattmoran, retrieved 2018-10-30.
 Ocean of Nectar: Wisdom and Compassion in Mahayana Buddhism, reviewed by John Powers, retrieved 2009-05-22.
 Understanding the Mind: The Nature and Power of the Mind, reviewed by Scott Bishop, retrieved 2009-12-20.

Book publishing companies based in New York (state)
Buddhist organizations
New Kadampa Tradition
Religious organizations established in 1983